British Jews (often referred to collectively as British Jewry or Anglo-Jewry) are British citizens who identify as Jewish. The number of people who identified as Jews in the United Kingdom rose by just under 4% between 2001 and 2021.

History

The first recorded Jewish community in Britain was brought to England in 1070 by King William the Conqueror, who believed that what he assumed to be its commercial skills would make his newly won country more prosperous. At the end of the 12th century, a series of blood libels and fatal pogroms hit England, particularly the east coast. Notably, on 16 March 1190, in the run up to the Third Crusade, the Jewish population of York was massacred at the site where Clifford's Tower now stands, and King Edward I of England passed the Statute of the Jewry (Statutum de Judaismo) in 1275, restricting the community's activities, most notably outlawing the practice of usury (charging interest). When, 15 years later, Edward found that many of these provisions were ignored, he expelled the Jews from England. They emigrated to countries such as Poland which protected them by law. A small English community persisted in hiding despite the expulsion. Jews were not banned from Scotland, which until 1707 was an independent kingdom; however, there is no record of a Jewish presence in Scotland before the 18th century. Jews were also not banned in Wales at the time, but Wales was eventually annexed to England under Henry VIII, at which point the ban extended to Wales, also. There is only one known record of a Jew in Wales between 1290 and the annexation, but it is possible individuals did persist there beyond 1290.

A small community of conversos was identified in Bristol in 1609 and made to leave. In 1656, Oliver Cromwell made it clear that the ban on Jewish settlement in England and Wales would no longer be enforced, although when Rabbi Manasseh Ben Israel brought a petition to allow Jews to return, the majority of the Protectorate Government turned it down. Nonetheless, the community considers 1656 to mark the readmission of the Jews to England and Wales. In mid-nineteenth century Ireland, then ruled by the British, Daniel O'Connell, known as "The Liberator" for his work on Catholic Emancipation, worked successfully for the repeal of the "De Judaismo" law, which prescribed a special yellow badge for Jews. Benjamin Disraeli (1804–1881), of Jewish birth although he joined the Church of England, served in government for three decades, twice as prime minister.

The oldest Jewish community in Britain is the Spanish and Portuguese Jewish community, which traces back to the 1630s (when it existed clandestinely, in London, before the readmission), and was unofficially legitimised in 1656, the date counted by the Jewish community as the re-admittance of the Jews to England (which at the time included Wales). A trickle of Ashkenazi immigration primarily from German countries continued from the late 17th century to the early 19th century, before a second wave of Ashkenazi immigration, a large wave of Ashkenazi Jewish immigration fleeing persecution in the Russian Empire, such as pogroms and the May Laws between 1880 and the imposition of tighter immigration restrictions in 1905. Many German and Polish Jews seeking to escape the Nazi Holocaust arrived in Britain before and after the Second World War. Around 80-90% of British Jews today are Ashkenazi.

Following de-colonisation, the late twentieth century saw Yemeni Jews, Iraqi Jews and Baghdadi Jews settle in the United Kingdom. A multicultural community, in 2006, British Jews celebrated the 350th anniversary of the resettlement in England.

Demographics

Population size

According to the 2021 United Kingdom census, there were 271,327 Jews in England and Wales, or 0.5% of the overall population. According to the 2011 census, 5,887 Jews lived in Scotland for a total of 277,214 self-identified Jews in Great Britain. This does not include much smaller communities in Northern Ireland or the Crown Dependencies. However, this final figure is considered an undercount. Demographers David Graham and Stanley Waterman give several reasons as for why: the underenumeration for censuses in general; the question did not record secular Jews; the voluntary nature of the question; suspicion by Jews of such questions; and the high non-response rate for large numbers of Haredi Jews. By comparison, the Jewish Virtual Library estimated a Jewish population of 291,000 (not limited to adherents of Judaism) in 2012, making Britain's Jewish community the fifth largest in the world. This equates to 0.43% of the population of the United Kingdom. The absolute number of Jews has been gradually rising since records began; in the 2011 census, 263,346 people in England and Wales answered "Jewish" to the voluntary question on religion, compared with 259,927 in of 2001.  

The 2001 Census included a (voluntary) religion question ("What is your religion?") for the first time in its history; 266,740 people listed their religion as "Jewish".  However, the subject of who is a Jew is complex, and the religion question did not record people who may be Jewish through other means, such as ethnically and culturally. Of people who chose Jewish as their religion, 97% put White as their ethnic group. However, a report by the Institute for Jewish Policy Research (JPR) suggests that, although there was an apparent option to write down "Jewish" for this question, it did not occur to many, because of "skin colour" and nationality bias, and that if "Jewish" was an explicit option, the results—only 2,594 respondents were Jewish solely by ethnicity—would have been different.  The religion question appeared in the 2011 Census, but there was still no explicit option for "Jewish" in the ethnic-group question. The Board of Deputies had encouraged all Jews to indicate they were Jewish, either through the religion question or the ethnicity one.

From 2005 to 2008, the Jewish population increased from 275,000 to 280,000, attributed largely to the high birth rates of Haredi (or ultra-Orthodox) Jews. Research by the University of Manchester in 2007 showed that 75% of British Jewish births were to the Haredi community. Ultra-Orthodox women have an average of 6.9 children, and secular Jewish women 1.65. In 2015, the Institute for Jewish Policy Research reported that in England the orthodox community was growing by nearly 5% per year, while the non-haredi community was decreasing by 0.3% per year. It has been also documented that in terms of births, between 2007 and 2015, the estimated number of Strictly Orthodox births per annum increased by 35%, rising from 1,431 to 1,932. Meanwhile, the estimated number of ‘Mainstream’ (non-Strictly Orthodox) births per annum increased to a lesser extent over the same period, going from 1,844 to 1,889 (+2.4%).

Historical population

Going into the 19th century, the Jewish population was small, likely no more than 20,000 individuals. However, the population quadrupled in just a few decades after 1881 as a large number of Jews fled oppression in the Russian Empire. The population increased by as much as 50% between 1933 and 1945, with the United Kingdom admitting around 70,000 Jews between 1933 and 1938, and a further 80,000 between 1938 and 1945. The late 1940s and early 1950s proved to be the high point, numerically speaking, for British Jewry. A decline followed, as many of the new arrivals moved to Israel, moved back to Europe, or emigrated elsewhere, and many other individuals assimilated. The decline continued into the 1990s, but has since reversed. The estimates given before the 2001 Census are likely not directly comparable to the Census, as the Census is based purely on self-identification, whereas the estimates are based on community membership, and it is probably the decline from 450,000 to 266,740 is more like a decline from 450,000 to somewhere between 300,000 and 350,000 going by the metrics of the estimators. Contemporary Jewish demographers like Sergio DellaPergola give figures around 300,000 for the British Jewish population in the early 2010s, since when it has grown.

Migration
The great majority (83.2%) of Jews in England and Wales were born in the UK. In 2015, about 6% of Jews in England held an Israeli passport. In 2019, the Office of National Statistics estimated that 21,000 people resident in the UK were born in Israel, up from 11,890 in 2001. Of the 21,000, 8,000 had Israeli nationality. In 2013, it was reported that antisemitic attacks in France led to an exodus of French Jews to the UK. This has resulted in some synagogues establishing French-language Shabbat services.

In 2018, 534 Britons emigrated to Israel, representing the third consecutive annual decline. The figure was one third down on 2015 and was the lowest for five years. Meanwhile, immigration of Jews from Israel is consistently higher than emigration of Jews to Israel, at a ratio of about 3:2, meaning the British Jewish community has a net gain of Jewish immigrants, to the point Israelis now represent around 6% of the British Jewish community.

Ethnicity

Geographic distribution
The majority of the Jews in the UK live in southeastern England, particularly in and around London. Around 145,480 Jews live in London itself - more than half the Jewish population of the entire country - notably the London boroughs of Barnet (56,620), Hackney (17,430), Camden (10,080), Haringey (9,400), Harrow (7,300), Redbridge (6,410), Westminster (5,630), Brent (3,720), Enfield (3,710), Islington (2,710) and Kensington and Chelsea (2,680). There are also 30,220 Jews living in districts that abut London but are outside the boundaries of London itself, of which 21,270 are in southern Hertfordshire and 4,930 are in southwestern Essex, giving a total population of 175,690 Jews in London and the districts and boroughs immediately surrounding it, as compared to 95,640 in the rest of England and Wales combined.

In total, including communities some distance from London, just under 46,000 Jews live in the six counties bordering Greater London, of which two-thirds live in areas immediately adjacent to London. There are, in total, more than 26,400 Jews in Hertfordshire, of which 18,350 are in the borough of Hertsmere in southwestern Hertfordshire adjacent to Jewish areas in Barnet and Harrow. Towns and villages in Hertsmere with large Jewish populations include Bushey (4,500), Borehamwood (3,900), and Radlett (2,300). Further afield from London, there is also a significant community in St Albans, as well as other smaller communities throughout the county. There are over 10,300 Jews in Essex, of which 4,380 live in the district of Epping Forest, in the county's southwest. There is also a significant community in Southend. In total, London and the counties around it are host to 70.56% of England and Wales' Jewish population, as of 2021. 

The next most significant population is in Greater Manchester, a community of more than 28,000, mostly in Bury (10,730), Salford (10,370), Manchester (2,630), and Trafford (2,410). There are also significant communities in Leeds (6,270), Gateshead (2,910), Brighton (2,460), St Albans (2,240), and Southend (2,060). Some historically sizeable communities like Liverpool, Bournemouth and Birmingham have experienced a steady decline and now number fewer than 2,000 self-identifying Jews each; conversely, there are small but growing communities in places like Bristol, Oxford and Cambridge.

The most Jewish county in the UK is Hertfordshire, which is 2.23% Jewish; this is followed by the City of London, on 2.06%, and then Greater London on 1.63%. Greater Manchester is 1.00% Jewish, Essex is 0.70% and East Sussex is 0.65%. No other county is as much as 0.50% Jewish. The least Jewish county or principal area in England and Wales is Merthyr Tydfil, which is less than 0.01% Jewish despite once having had a significant community. Hertsmere and Barnet councils are the most Jewish local authorities in England, with Jews composing one in six and seven residents respectively.  Finchley and Golders Green is the political constituency with the largest Jewish population in the UK. 

The Scottish population is concentrated in East Renfrewshire, where around 2,400 Jews live, over 40% of the Scottish Jewish population, largely in or near the town of Newton Mearns. Fewer than 900 Jews live in both Glasgow and Edinburgh; the remaining 30% of Scottish Jewry is scattered throughout the country. The largest Welsh community is in Cardiff, with almost 700 Jews, comprising about a third of the Welsh Jewish population and 0.19% of the population of Cardiff itself. The only synagogue in Northern Ireland is in Belfast, where the community has fewer than 100 active members, although 335 people recorded their religion as Jewish in the Northern Irish census of 2011. There are small communities throughout the Channel Islands, and there is an active synagogue in St Brelade, Jersey, although the Jewish population of the island is only 49. There is only a small number of Jews on the Isle of Man, with no synagogue.

Age profile

The British Jewish population has an older profile than the general population. In England and Wales, the median age of male Jews is 41.2, while the figure for all males is 36.1; Jewish females have a median age of 44.3, while the figure for all females is 38.1.  About 24% of the community are over the age of 65 (compared to 16% of the general population of England and Wales). In the 2001 census, Jews were the only group in which the number of persons in the 75-plus cohorts outnumbered those in the 65–74 cohort.

Education
About 60% of school-age Jewish children attend Jewish schools. Jewish day schools and yeshivas are found throughout the country. Jewish cultural studies and Hebrew language instruction are commonly offered at synagogues in the form of supplementary Hebrew schools or Sunday schools.

The majority of Jewish schools in Britain are funded by the government. Jewish educational centres are plentiful, large-scale projects. One of the country's most famous Jewish schools is the state-funded JFS in London which opened in 1732 and has about 2100 students. It is heavily over-subscribed and applies strict rules on admissions, which led to a discrimination court case, R (E) v Governing Body of JFS, in 2009. In 2011, another large state-funded school opened in North London named JCoSS, the first cross-denomination Jewish secondary school in the UK.

The Union of Jewish Students is an umbrella organisation that represents Jewish students at university. In 2011 there were over 50 Jewish Societies.

British Jews generally have high levels of educational achievement. Compared to the general population, they are 40% less likely to have no qualifications, and 80% more likely to have "higher-level" qualifications. With the exception of under-25s, younger Jews tend to be better educated than older ones. However, dozens of the all-day educational establishments in the Haredi community of Stamford Hill, which are accused of neglecting secular skills such as English and maths, claim not to be schools under the meaning of the Department for Education.

The annual Limmud festival is a high-profile educational event of the British Jewish community, attracting a wide range of international presenters.

Employment and income
The 2001 UK Census showed that 30.5% of economically active Jews were self-employed, compared to a figure of 14.2% for the general population. Jews aged 16–24 were less likely to be economically active than their counterparts in the general population; 89.2% of these were students. In a 2010 study, average income per working adult was £15.44 an hour.  Median income and wealth were significantly higher than other religious groups. In a 2015 study, poverty has risen the fastest per generation than other religious groups.

Marriage
In 2016, the Institute for Jewish Policy Research reported that the intermarriage rate for the Jewish community in the UK was 26%. This was less than half of the US rate of 58% and showed little change from the rate in the early 1980s of 23%, though more than twice the 11% level of the end of the 1960s. Around one third of the children of mixed marriages are brought up in the Jewish faith.

Religion
There are around 454 synagogues in the country, and it is estimated that 56.3% of all households across the UK with at least one Jew living within them held synagogue membership in 2016.  The percentage of households adhering to specific denominations is as follows:
 Orthodox ("consisting of the United Synagogue, the Federation of Synagogues and independent Orthodox synagogues") – 42.8%
 Strictly Orthodox ("synagogues aligned with the Union of Orthodox Hebrew Congregations and others of a similar ethos") – 23.5%
 Reform (Movement for Reform Judaism and Westminster Synagogue and Chaim V'Tikvah and Hastings and District Jewish Society) – 19.3%
 Liberal (Liberal Judaism and Belsize Square Synagogue) – 8.2%
 Masorti (Assembly of Masorti Synagogues) – 3.3%
 Sephardi – 2.9%

Those in the United Kingdom who consider themselves Jews identify as follows:
 34% Secular
 18% Ultra Orthodox
 14% Modern Orthodox
 14% Reform
 10% Traditional, but not very religious
  6% Liberal
  2% Conservative
  2% Sephardi 

The Stanmore and Canons Park Synagogue in the London Borough of Harrow said in 2015 that it had the largest membership of any single Orthodox synagogue in Europe.

Media
There are a number of Jewish newspapers, magazines and other media published in Britain on a national or regional level. The most well known is The Jewish Chronicle,  founded in 1841 and the world's oldest continuously published Jewish newspaper. Other publications include the Jewish News, Jewish Telegraph, Hamodia, the Jewish Tribune and Jewish Renaissance. In April 2020, The Jewish Chronicle and the Jewish News, which had announced plans to merge in February and later announced plans for a joint liquidation, continued as separate entities after the former was acquired by a consortium.

Politics

Before the 2015 general election, 69% of British Jews surveyed were planning to vote for the Conservative Party, while 22% would vote for the Labour Party. A May 2016 poll of British Jews showed 77% would vote Conservative, 13.4% Labour, and 7.3% Liberal Democrat. An October 2019 poll of British Jews showed 64% would vote Conservative, 24% Liberal Democrat, and only 6% Labour.

Jews are typically seen as predominantly middle-class, though historically many Jews lived in working-class communities of London. According to polling in 2015, politicians' attitudes towards Israel influence the vote of three out of four British Jews.

In London, most of the top constituencies with the largest Jewish populations voted Conservative in the 2010 general election - these are namely, Finchley and Golders Green, Hendon, Harrow East, Chipping Barnet, Ilford North, and Hertsmere in Hertfordshire. The exceptions were Hackney North and Stoke Newington and Hampstead and Kilburn, which both voted Labour in the election. Outside the region, large Jewish constituencies voted for Labour, namely Bury South and Blackley and Broughton.

Some MPs, such as Robert Jenrick and Keir Starmer, while not Jewish themselves, are married to Jews and have Jewish children.

Antisemitism

The earliest Jewish settlement was recorded in 1070, soon after the Norman Conquest. Jews living in the England at this time experienced religious discrimination and it is thought that the blood libel which accused Jews of ritual murder originated in Northern England, leading to massacres and increasing discrimination.[2] The Jewish presence continued until King Edward I's Edict of Expulsion in 1290.[3]

Jews were readmitted into the Commonwealth of England, Scotland and Ireland by Oliver Cromwell in 1655, though it is believed that crypto-Jews lived in England during the expulsion.[4] Jews were regularly subjected to discrimination and humiliation which waxed and waned over the centuries, gradually declining.[5]

In the late 19th and early 20th centuries, the number of Jews in Britain greatly increased due to the exodus from Russia, which resulted in a large community forming in the East End of London.[6] Popular sentiment against immigration was used by the British Union of Fascists to incite hatred against Jews, leading to the Battle of Cable Street in 1936, when the fascists were forced to abandon their march through an area with a large Jewish population when the police clearing the way were unable to remove barricades defended by trade unionists, left wing groups and residents.[7]

In the aftermath of the Holocaust, undisguised racial hatred of Jews became unacceptable in British society. Outbursts of antisemitism emanating from far right groups continued, however, leading to the formation of the 43 Group led by Jewish ex-servicemen which broke up fascist meetings from 1945 to early 1950.

Records of antisemitic incidents have been compiled since 1984, although changing reporting practices and levels of reporting make comparison over time difficult. The Community Security Trust (CST) was formed in 1994 to "[protect] British Jews from antisemitism and related threats". It works in conjunction with the police and other authorities to protect Jewish schools, Synagogues, and other community institutions.

Communal institutions

British Jewish communal organisations include:

 Anglo-Jewish Association
 Association of Jewish Refugees
 Board of Deputies (1760)
 CCJO René Cassin
 Community Security Trust
 Institute for Jewish Policy Research
 Jewish Board of Guardians
 Jewish Book Council
 Jewish Care
 Jewish Council for Racial Equality
 Jewish Genealogical Society of Great Britain
 Jewish Leadership Council
 JW3 – a London venue
 Kisharon
 League of British Jews
 League of Jewish Women
 Leo Baeck Institute London
 Liberal Judaism
 Limmud
 London Jewish Forum
 London Jewish Cultural Centre
 Maccabaeans
 Mitzvah Day International
 Movement for Reform Judaism
 Norwood
 Scottish Council of Jewish Communities
 Tzelem
 UCL Institute of Jewish Studies
 UK Jewish Film Festival
 Union of Jewish Students
 United Restitution Organization
 United Synagogue
 Union of Jewish Women
 World Jewish Relief

See also

 List of British Jews
 List of Jewish communities in the United Kingdom
 History of the Jews in England
 History of the Jews in Scotland
 History of the Jews in Ireland
 History of the Jews in the Isle of Man
 Emancipation of the Jews in the United Kingdom

Notes and references

Notes

References

Sources
  . All-Party Parliamentary Group against Antisemitism. September 2006. Accessed 1 April 2011.  24 November 2010. See inquiry website.
  . Jewish Leadership Council. 2008. Accessed 4 April 2011.
 , 4.93 MiB. See webpage.
 , 2.68 MiB. See webpage.
 Casale Mashiah, Donatella; Boyd, Jonathan (14 July 2017), Synagogue membership in the United Kingdom in 2016, Institute for Jewish Research

Further reading

 Anti-Semitism Worldwide 1999/2000. Stephen Roth Institute. Distributed by the University of Nebraska Press. pp. 125–135.
 Cesarani, David (1994). The Jewish Chronicle and Anglo-Jewry, 1841–1991. Cambridge University Press.
 Cesarani, David. "British Jews". Liedtke, Rainer; Wendehorst, Stephan. (eds) (1999). The Emancipation of Catholics, Jews and Protestants: Minorities and the Nation State in Nineteenth-Century Europe. Manchester University Press. pp. 33–55.
 Endelman, Todd M. (2002). The Jews of Britain, 1656 to 2000. University of California Press.
 Spector, Sheila A. (ed) (2002). British Romanticism and the Jews: History, Culture, Literature. Palgrave Macmillan.
 Valins, Oliver; Kosmin, Barry; Goldberg, Jacqueline. "The future of Jewish schooling in the United Kingdom". Institute for Jewish Policy Research. 31 December 2002. Accessed 4 April 2011.
 London, Louise (2003). Whitehall and the Jews, 1933–1948: British Immigration Policy, Jewish Refugees and the Holocaust. Cambridge University Press.
 Schreiber, Mordecai; Schiff, Alvin I.; Klenicki, Leon. (2003). The Shengold Jewish Encyclopedia (3rd edition). Schreiber Publishing. pp. 79–80.
 Wynne-Jones, Jonathan; additional reporting by Jeffay, Nathan. "Is this the last generation of British Jews?". The Daily Telegraph. 26 November 2006. Accessed 1 April 2011.
 Shindler, Colin. "The Reflection of Israel Within British Jewry". Ben-Moshe, Danny; Segev, Zohar (eds) (2007). Israel, the Diaspora, and Jewish Identity. Sussex Academic Press. pp. 227–234.
 Butt, Riazat. "Faith in numbers". The Guardian. 20 November 2007. Accessed 4 April 2011.
 Lawless, Jill. "London's Jewish Museum reopens after major facelift". Associated Press via USA Today. 17 March 2010. Accessed 1 April 2011.
 Graham, David; Boyd, Jonathan.  . Institute for Jewish Policy Research. 15 July 2010. Accessed 4 April 2011.  22 July 2011. See webpage.
 Brown, Mick. "Inside the private world of London's ultra-Orthodox Jews". The Daily Telegraph. 25 February 2011. Accessed 1 April 2011.
 "Publications on British Jews from the Berman Jewish Policy Archive @ NYU Wagner".

External links 
 Anglo-Jewish Archives. University of Southampton

Jews and Judaism in the United Kingdom
British people of Jewish descent